The following is a partial list of military tombstone abbreviations used in American cemeteries.

United States

Ranks 
 BBG = Brevet Brigadier General
 BGEN = Brigadier General
 BMG = Brevet Major General
 CAPT = Captain
 CDR = Commander
 CMSGT = Chief Master Sergeant
 COL = Colonel
 CPL = Corporal
 CPT = Captain
 CSGT = Commissary Sergeant
 ENS = Ensign
 GEN = General
 LCDR = Lieutenant Commander
 LCPL = Lance Corporal
 LGEN = Lieutenant General
 LT = Lieutenant
 1LT = First Lieutenant (2LT = Second Lieutenant, and so on)
 LTC = Lieutenant Colonel
 MAJ = Major
 MGEN = Major General
 MSGT = Master Sergeant
 NCO = Non-Commissioned Officer
 OSGT = Ordnance Sergeant
 PFC = Private First Class
 PVT = Private
 PVT 1CL = Private First Class
 QM = Quartermaster
 QMSGT = Quartermaster Sergeant
 SFC = Sergeant First Class
 SGM = Sergeant Major
 SGT = Sergeant
 SMSGT = Senior Master Sergeant
 SPC = Specialist
 TSGT = Technical Sergeant
 WO = Warrant Officer

U.S. Civil War (1861–1865)

Regiments 
 58 PENN. INF. = 58th Regiment of the Pennsylvania Infantry Volunteers
 185 N.Y. INF. = 185th Regiment of the New York Infantry Volunteers

Divisions 
 CO. G = Company G
 CO. K = Company K

World War I (1917–1918)

Divisions 
 17 CO = 17th Company

See also 
 United States Department of Veterans Affairs emblems for headstones and markers

References
 National Cemetery Administration: Headstone and Marker Inscription Abbreviations

Military cemeteries
Military tombstones